The Winchmore Hill Post Office Sorting Office at Station Road, Winchmore Hill, London, is a grade II listed building with Historic England. It was designed by Jasper Wager and built by Mattock and Parsons in 1904.

References 

Grade II listed buildings in the London Borough of Enfield
Winchmore Hill
Royal Mail
Sorting offices